Pedro de Valdivia Airport,  is an airport serving María Elena, a saltpeter mining facility in the Antofagasta Region of Chile.

See also

Transport in Chile
List of airports in Chile

References

External links
OpenStreetMap - Pedro de Valdivia Airport
FallingRain - Pedro de Valdivia Airport

Airports in Chile
Airports in Antofagasta Region